Zohreh Elahian (born  1968) is an Iranian conservative politician who served a member of the Parliament of Iran from 2008 to 2012, representing Tehran, Rey, Shemiranat and Eslamshahr.

References 

1968 births
Living people
Members of the 8th Islamic Consultative Assembly
Deputies of Tehran, Rey, Shemiranat and Eslamshahr
Society of Pathseekers of the Islamic Revolution politicians
Members of the Women's fraction of Islamic Consultative Assembly
21st-century Iranian women politicians
21st-century Iranian politicians